Ibn Kabar (Shams al-Riʾāsa Abū al-Barakāt ibn Kabar, d. 1324) was a Coptic Christian author of an ecclesiastical encyclopedia known as Mișbâḥ al-ẓulma.

He was secretary to the Mamluk minister  Baybars al-Manșûrî, presumably editing the latter's work Zubdat al-fikra fi ta'rîkh al-hijra ("quintessence of thought in Muslim history").
He was ordained as a priest in 1300, under the name of Barsum and took office in Mu'allaqah, the ancient Coptic church in Cairo. A number of rhyming Arabic sermons of his have been preserved. 
He had to flee the persecution of Christians in 1321, and died shortly after.

His main works are: 
Al-Sullam al-kabir "the great ladder", a Bohairic-Arabic lexicon. This work was widely received and survives in numerous copies. It was first edited in 1643 in Rome with a Latin translation by Athanasius Kircher (Lingua Aegyptiaca Restituta).
 Mișbâḥ al-ẓulma wa-îḍâḥ al-khidma ("the lamp of shadows and the illumination of service"), an ecclesiastical encyclopedia in 24 chapters and divided in two large parts. The first part, chapters 1 to 6, is dedicated to dogmatic and canonical matters (theology, hagiography, canon law, biblical exegesis) and the second part (chapters 8 to 24) deals with the office of the various categories of priests from a liturgical and practical viewpoint. Interposed between the two parts is chapter 7, a very valuable catalogue of books by Christian authors of different denominations that were available in Arabic (partly via translation from Greek, Syriac or Coptic) at the time.

References
 Eugène Tisserant, Louis Villecourt, Gaston Wiet, Recherches sur la personnalité et la vie d'Abul Barakat Ibn Kubr, Revue de l'Orient chrétien XXII, 1921–22,  373-394.
 Eugène Tisserant, 'Le calendrier d'Abû l-Barakât ', Patrologia Orientalis 49   Paris, Firmin-Didot, 1915, 47-286.
 Samir Khalil Samir (ed.), Mișbâḥ al-ẓulma fī iḑâḥ al-khidma, 2 volumes, Cairo,  1971-1998.
 Samir Khalil Samir, 'L'encyclopédie liturgique d'Ibn Kabar († 1324) et son apologie d'usages coptes', in: H.-J. Feulner, E. Velkovska, R. F. Taft (eds.), Crossroad of Cultures. Studies in liturgy and patristics in honor of Gabriele Winkler (Orientalia Christiana Analecta 260), Rome, 2000, 619-655.
 Wilhelm Riedel (ed.),'Der Katalog der christlichen Schriften in arabischer Sprache von Abū l-Barakāt', Nachrichten der kgl. Gesellschaft der Wissenschaften zu Göttingen, philologisch-hist. Klasse 5 (1902), 635-706.
 Louis Villecourt, Eugène Tisserant, Gaston Wiet (eds.), 'Livre de la lampe des ténèbres et de l'exposition (lumineuse) du service (de l'Église)', Patrologia Orientalis 99, Paris, Firmin-Didot, 1929.

Coptic Orthodox priests
Coptic Orthodox Christians from Egypt
1324 deaths